The 2015 Distal & ITR Group Tennis Cup was a professional tennis tournament played on clay courts. It was the 9th edition of the men's tournament which was part of the 2015 ATP Challenger Tour, offering a total of €42,500+H in prize money. The event took place at the Tennis Club Todi in Todi, Italy, on 6 – 12 July 2015.

Singles main draw entrants

Seeds 

 1 Rankings as of 29 June 2015

Other entrants 
The following players received wildcards into the singles main draw:
  Andrea Arnaboldi
  Federico Gaio
  Gianluca Mager

The following players received entry as alternates:
  Mathias Bourgue
  Alejandro González

The following player received entry as a special exempt:
  Andrej Martin

The following players received entry from the qualifying draw:
  Matteo Donati
  Lorenzo Giustino
  Stéphane Robert
  Frederico Ferreira Silva

Champions

Singles 

  Aljaž Bedene def.  Nicolás Kicker 7–6(7–3), 6–4

Doubles 

  Flavio Cipolla /  Máximo González def.  Andreas Beck /  Peter Gojowczyk 6–4, 6–1

External links 
 Official website 

2015 ATP Challenger Tour
2015
2015 in Italian tennis